Tsona Cave is an archaeological site at the head of the river Qvirila in proximity of village   in the  Java Municipality in Shida Kartli in Georgia. The site is close to the Bouba-Kakheri pass at south of the Caucasus range.

History 
Tsona Cave was discovered by A. Kalandadze in 1958. It was excavated by Kalandadze,  Tushabramishvili and later by Z. Kikodze. 

The cave is located at 2100 m above sea level and therefore it is one of the highest archaeological cave sites in the country. Excavations at the site revealed Lower and Middle Paleolithic archaeological remains.

References

Archaeological sites in Georgia (country)
Caves of Georgia (country)